This article contains lists of official third party or independent candidates associated with the 2008 United States presidential election.

Third party is a term commonly used in the United States to refer to political parties other than the two major parties, the Democratic Party and Republican Party. The term is used as innumerate shorthand for all such parties, or sometimes only the largest of them.

An independent candidate is one who runs for office with no formal party affiliation.
 
Candidates who received, or ran for, the presidential nomination of a political party other than that of the two major parties in the 2008 presidential election, as well those who ran as independents, are listed below.

Candidates who qualified for minimum 270 electoral votes

The following nominees appeared on enough state ballots to theoretically obtain the minimum 270 electoral votes needed to win the election.

Constitution Party

Ticket

Candidates

Green Party

Ticket

Candidates

Libertarian Party

Ticket

Candidates

Independent
For independent candidates that did not achieve ballot access in enough states to win 270 electoral votes, see Independents section.

Other candidates

The nominees of the following parties appeared on fewer state ballots than needed to qualify for the minimum 270 electoral votes required to win the electoral college. These candidates could only theoretically have been elected in the unlikely event of a successful write-in campaign, or in the event that no candidate received at least 270 electoral votes. In the latter scenario, the election of the President would be determined by the House of Representatives.

Boston Tea Party

New American Independent Party

Objectivist Party

Party for Socialism and Liberation

Prohibition Party

Reform Party

Socialist Party USA

Socialist Workers Party

Independents

See also
List of candidates in the United States presidential election, 2008
Democratic Party presidential candidates, 2008
Republican Party presidential candidates, 2008
2008 United States presidential election timeline
List of political parties in the United States

References

External links
Photo Gallery with Fun Facts of Third Party candidates
Politics1 Presidency 2008 (includes Third Party and Independent candidates)

 
2008 presidential candidates